Thin filament pyrometry (TFP) is an optical method used to measure temperatures. It involves the placement of a thin filament in a hot gas stream. Radiative emissions from the filament can be correlated with filament temperature. Filaments are typically silicon carbide (SiC) fibers with a diameter of 15 micrometres. Temperatures of about 800–2500 K can be measured.

History
TFP was first used by V. Vilimpoc and L.P. Goss (1988). A recent paper using TFP is Maun et al. (2007).

Technique
The typical TFP apparatus consists of a flame or other hot gas stream, a filament, and a camera.

Advantages
TFP has several advantages, including the ability to simultaneously measure temperatures along a line and minimal intrusiveness. Most other forms of pyrometry are not capable of providing gas-phase temperatures.

Drawbacks
Calibration is required. Calibration typically is performed with a thermocouple. Both thermocouples and filaments require corrections in estimating gas temperatures from probe temperatures. Also, filaments are fragile and typically break after about an hour in a flame.

Applications
The primary application is to combustion and fire research.

See also
 ASTM Subcommittee E20.02 on Radiation Thermometry

References
 L.G. Blevins, M.W. Renfro, K.H. Lyle, N.M. Laurendeau, J.P. Gore, Experimental study of temperature and CH radical location in partially premixed CH4/air coflow flames , Combustion and Flame 118 (4) 684-696 (1999).
 J.D. Maun, Thin-Filament Pyrometry With a Digital Still Camera, M.S. Thesis, University of Maryland (2006).
 J.D. Maun, Peter B. Sunderland, D.L. Urban, Applied Optics, 46:483-488 (2007).
 W.M. Pitts, Proceedings of the Combustion Institute 26:1171-1179 (1996).
 V. Vilimpoc, L.P. Goss, Proceedings of the Combustion Institute 22:1907-1914 (1988).

Combustion
Measurement
Radiometry